Armon Collins, better known by his stage name Scarub, is an American rapper and record producer from Los Angeles, California. He is a member of the collective Living Legends. He has also been a member of Log Cabin, 3 Melancholy Gypsys, and Afro Classics.

Biography
Scarub was born Armon Collins. He grew up in Los Angeles, California. He attended Alexander Hamilton High School.

Scarub's first solo studio album, The Answer 2wo the Meaning, was released in 1997. He released A Fact of the Matter in 1999, Heavenbound in 2000, A New Perspective in 2004, and One for the Road: Volume One in 2006. In 2011, he released The California EP. In 2014, he released Want for Nothing, which featured guest appearances from Mimi Fresh, Emily Afton Moldy, and Anderson .Paak, among others.

Discography

Studio albums
 The Answer 2wo the Meaning (1997)
 Project (1999) 
 A Fact of the Matter (1999)
 Heavenbound (2000)
 Afro Classics? (2002) 
 A New Perspective (2004)
 One for the Road: Volume One (2006)
 Classic Rock (2009) 
 Want for Nothing (2014)
 Girls Girls Girls (2019)

EPs
 The Classic EP (2009) 
 The California EP (2011)

Singles
 "Savvy Traveler" (1999)
 "Good Times" (2001)
 "Don't Worry" (2002) 
 "Gangsta Wit It" (2005)
 "Keep On Stepping" (2006)

Guest appearances
 Eligh - "8Tred" from A Story of 2 Worlds (1997)
 Eligh - "Lifesize Puzzle" from Gas Dream (1999)
 Sunspot Jonz - "Unstoppable" from Don't Let 'Em Stop You (2003)
 The Grouch & Eligh - "Atlantis" from No More Greener Grasses (2003)
 Crown City Rockers - "Balance" from Earthtones (2004)
 Sunspot Jonz - "The Conductor" from No Guts No Glory (2005)
 The Grouch - "Hot Air Balloons" from Show You the World (2008)
 Acid Reign - "Comfort Zone" from Time & Change (2008)
 Felt - "Protagonists (Full Clip Remix)" (2009)
 Toki Wright - "Rise" from A Different Mirror (2009)
 Mystik Journeymen - "There Will Be Blood" from Return 2 the Love (2010)
 Eligh - "Beneath the Sea" from Grey Crow (2010)
 Inspired Flight - "It's the Chemicals" from We All Want to Fly (2010)
 Himself - "Do What You Feel" from Feel Like a Star (2011)
 Luckyiam - "Prolly Get Slapped" from Time to Get Lucky (2012)
 Souls of Mischief - "Stone Cold" from There Is Only Now (2014)
 Ghostface Killah and Adrian Younge - "Rise Up" and "Death's Invitation" from Twelve Reasons to Die II (2015)
 The Funk Junkie - "Touch the Ground" from Moondirt (2017)
 The Grouch - "The Drummer" from Unlock the Box (2018)

References

External links
 
 

Year of birth missing (living people)
Living people
African-American male rappers
American hip hop record producers
Musicians from Los Angeles
Rappers from Los Angeles
Record producers from California
21st-century American rappers
21st-century American male musicians
21st-century African-American musicians